Chris Zook is a business writer and partner at Bain & Company, leading its Global Strategy Practice. He currently resides in Amsterdam, the Netherlands and in Boston, Massachusetts. He is listed by The Times (London) as one of the world's top 50 business thinkers.

Education
Zook received a B.A. in mathematics and economics from Williams College, a M.Phil. in economics from Exeter College, Oxford University, and a MPP and Ph.D in Public Policy Analysis from the Harvard Kennedy School.

Books
Zook is an author of books and articles on business strategy, growth, and the importance of leadership economics, including the Profit from the Core trilogy. In 2001, he published Profit from the Core, which found that nine out of ten companies that had sustained profitable growth for a decade had focused on their core businesses, rather than diversification. The sequel, Beyond the Core, examines how companies that have fully exploited their core businesses can systematically and successfully expand beyond into related, or adjacent areas. Unstoppable completes the series and examines what to do when a previously viable growth formula of the past begins to approach its limits, and how companies can change their strategic focus and redefine their core. In 2010, Harvard Business School press published an updated version of Profit From the Core, subtitled "A Return to Growth in Turbulent Times." The updated edition describes how principles from the trilogy enabled companies to continue growing during the global financial crisis that began in 2008. 

All three books are based on a growth study, begun in 1990 at Bain & Company, that involves thousands of companies worldwide. The study's findings have been expanded each year. A fourth book, "Repeatability," expands on the themes of the trilogy. It argues that complexity is a silent killer of profitable growth, while successful companies endure by maintaining simplicity at their core.

Bibliography

References

External links
 Financial Times. "The simple (but not easy) task of focusing"
 The Wall Street Journal. Q&A: Strategies for Growth
 Profit from the Core official website
 Beyond the Core official website
 Unstoppable official website
 "Repeatability" official website

Year of birth missing (living people)
Living people
American economics writers
American male non-fiction writers
American business writers
Williams College alumni
Alumni of Exeter College, Oxford
Harvard Kennedy School alumni